The manga series Uwasa no Midori-kun!! was written and illustrated by Gō Ikeyamada. It was serialised in Shogakukan's Shōjo Comic in December 2006 where it ran until its conclusion in October 2008. The individual chapters were collected and published in ten tankōbon volumes by Shogakukan. Two of its chapters are used in Gō Ikeyamada's Shōnen x Cinderella.

Volume list

References

Uwasa no Midori-kun!!